Happiness Is a Warm Blanket, Charlie Brown is a Peanuts animated television special that was released in 2011. The special is the 45th Peanuts special and the first produced without Bill Melendez on the production team. It is also the first special without the direct involvement of Peanuts creator Charles M. Schulz, Lee Mendelson Productions or Bill Melendez Productions (it is unknown, though, if Lee Mendelson also worked on this special). In addition, it is the first Peanuts special produced in part under Warner Bros. Television, which holds the home media distribution rights to the Peanuts specials.

The special was released on DVD on March 29, 2011, and first aired on television on October 1, 2011, on Teletoon in Canada. The special premiered in the United States on Thanksgiving Day, November 24, 2011, at 8:30PM ET/PT on Fox, the first Peanuts special to air on the network; with this airing, Peanuts specials have aired on all four major networks. Coincidentally, the first half of the film's original Fox broadcast in 2011 competed directly with a Peanuts special that aired at the same time on ABC ("The Mayflower Voyagers" from This Is America, Charlie Brown). The special aired again on November 23, 2012 (the day after Thanksgiving, so as not to directly compete with the other Peanuts specials) and December 17, 2013.

The program special is particularly notable in that the characters/animation are drawn in a 1950s/early-1960s style, and it uses only characters from that time period (including Violet, Shermy, and Patty), except for the inclusion of one later character, Woodstock, and intermediate-era characters Frieda, Faron, 5, 4, and 3 appearing briefly as extras; and even pays homage to the very first Peanuts strip, from October 2, 1950 (when Charlie Brown has a flashback sequence).

The title recalls the 1960s Peanuts phrase "Happiness Is a Warm Puppy," which became a cultural reference.

This special is the only Peanuts TV special to be made in the 2010s.

Plot 
The special starts in medias res when Woodstock follows holes dug by Linus, who is looking for his security blanket and wonders how the incident started. A week earlier, Charlie Brown is shown playing baseball with his friends, and Linus is criticized for bringing his blanket. Later, Lucy informs Linus that their grandmother is coming this weekend, and if Linus doesn't get rid of his blanket, it will be cut up into pieces by their grandmother. Meanwhile, Schroeder is playing piano, and Lucy tries to get him to notice her, with her only obstacle being a bust on Schroeder's piano.

Charlie Brown suggests that Linus finds a substitute for the blanket, which only works to some extent. In the meantime, Violet and Patty roast Pig-Pen for his dirt cloud. Later, Lucy decides to lock Linus' blanket in the closet for the day, and this time, Linus is to have no substitutes for his blanket. The next day, Snoopy steals Linus' blanket again, and Lucy turns it into a kite, which gets lost after she lets go of it. Later, Lucy smashes the bust on Schroeder's piano, only for him to have a replacement bust.

A few days later, Linus gets his blanket back, only for Lucy to bury it, which leads to the scene the special started. Snoopy digs up the blanket for Linus, probably out of pity. The next day, Snoopy drags Linus and his blanket across the neighborhood, which all the children follow as they get affected in their path. After all the children criticize Linus to his limit, he finally delivers a monologue about how everyone needs some security, while pointing out their own securities that are like his blanket (Sally's being "Sweet Baboo"s, Schroeder's being Beethoven, and Snoopy's being suppertime, “24 hours a day”). Later, Grandma Van Pelt arrives, and Linus gives her a washcloth as a decoy of his blanket. The story ends with Linus trying to get his blanket back after Snoopy steals it, shouting "AUGH!!"

Voices 
 Austin Lux as Linus van Pelt
 Amanda Pace as Sally Brown
 Trenton Rogers as Charlie Brown/Schroeder
 Grace Rolek as Lucy van Pelt
 Shane Baumel as "Pig-Pen"
 Blesst Bowden as Violet Gray
 Ciara Bravo as Patty
 Andy Pessoa as Shermy
 Andy Beall as Snoopy
Frieda, Faron, 5, 3, and 4 have cameo appearances but are silent.

Production 
The film was announced on the NBC broadcast of the 84th annual Macy's Thanksgiving Day Parade when a Snoopy balloon (in his flying ace outfit) passed by. One of the hosts of the broadcast, Meredith Vieira announced the film by saying "Snoopy fans will be happy to know that next year, a new Peanuts animation will be flying your way."

The last Peanuts special had been in 2006. Craig Schulz, son of the strip's creator, said the intention was to use 1960s style animation. WildBrain Entertainment employed Yearim Productions in Korea to do the work. Schulz also said the majority of the script used the actual strips, supplemented by work by Pearls Before Swine creator Stephan Pastis. Pastis had the idea to focus on Linus' blanket.

After the death of Bill Melendez, the voices of Snoopy and Woodstock were provided by director Andrew Beall, however, in later Peanuts animated productions, some recordings of Melendez were used.

The film was scored by Devo frontman Mark Mothersbaugh.

Some scenes come from It's an Adventure, Charlie Brown, The Charlie Brown and Snoopy Show, and A Charlie Brown Celebration.

Blu-ray and DVD release 
Happiness Is a Warm Blanket, Charlie Brown was released on Blu-ray and DVD March 29, 2011 by Warner Home Video and includes the following special features:
 Deconstructing Schulz: From Comic Strip to Screenplay
 Happiness Is...Finding the Right Voice
 24 Frames a Second: Drawing and Animating a Peanuts Movie
 Deleted Scene featuring an introduction by Director Andy Beall

References

External links 
 
 

Peanuts television specials
2010s American television specials
2010s animated television specials
2011 television specials
Fox television specials
Films scored by Mark Mothersbaugh